Bebhionn may refer to:
 Bebhionn (moon), a moon of Saturn
 Bébinn, an early Irish goddess